Al-Shahrani is an Arabic surname relative to the clan Shahran, located in the South-West of the Arabian Peninsula, specifically in the Asir region. It may also refer to:

 Ibrahim Al-Shahrani, Saudi footballer
 Mohammed Al-Shahrani (footballer, born 1982), Saudi footballer
 Mohammed Al-Shahrani (footballer, born 1996), Saudi footballer
 Yasser Al-Shahrani, Saudi footballer
Dr Abdullah Ali Al Shahrani 1970, a medical doctor from Al Serhan .

Arabic-language surnames
Tribes of Arabia